Rangpur Public School and College is a renowned school and college in Rangpur, Bangladesh. It was founded in 2010. It was started functioning in 2010 from nursery to class V. Year passed it extended up to class XI-XII.
All courses of this school and college have been affiliated with the Board of Intermediate and Secondary Education, Dinajpur.

Location
Darshana More, Rangpur.

References

Dinajpur Education Board
Schools in Rangpur District
Colleges in Rangpur District